Raciborowice may refer to the following places:
Raciborowice, Lesser Poland Voivodeship (south Poland)
Raciborowice, Łódź Voivodeship (central Poland)
Raciborowice, Lublin Voivodeship (east Poland)